Anasagaram is a village in the Krishna district of the southern Indian state of Andhra Pradesh. It is part of the mandal of Nandigama.

References

Villages in Krishna district